Belgaum Cantonment is a cantonment in Belgaum district  in the state of Karnataka, India.

Demographics
 India census, Belgaum Cantonment had a population of 23,678. Males constitute 59% of the population and females 41%. 10% of the population is under 6 years of age.

References

Cantonments of India
Cantonments of British India
Cities and towns in Belagavi district

cantonment